|}

This is a list of electoral district results for the 1911 Victorian state election.

Results by electoral district

Abbotsford

Albert Park 

 Two party preferred votes were estimated.

Allandale

Ballarat East 

 Two party preferred vote was estimated.

Ballarat West

Barwon

Benalla

Benambra

Bendigo East 

 Two party preferred vote was estimated.

Bendigo West

Boroondara

Borung

Brighton

Brunswick

Bulla

Carlton

Castlemaine and Maldon

Collingwood

Dalhousie 

 Preferences were not distributed.

Dandenong

Daylesford

Dundas

Eaglehawk

East Melbourne

Essendon

Evelyn 

 Preferences were not distributed.

Fitzroy

Flemington

Geelong

Gippsland East

Gippsland North

Gippsland South

Gippsland West 

 Two party preferred vote was estimated.

Glenelg

Goulburn Valley

Grenville

Gunbower

Hampden 

 Two party preferred vote was estimated.

Hawthorn 

 Two party preferred vote was estimated.

Jika Jika

Kara Kara

Korong

Lowan

Maryborough

Melbourne

Mornington

North Melbourne

Ovens

Polwarth

Port Fairy

Port Melbourne

Prahran

Richmond

Rodney

St Kilda

Stawell and Ararat

Swan Hill

Toorak 

 Preferences were not distributed.

Upper Goulburn

Walhalla

Wangaratta

Waranga

Warrenheip

Warrnambool

Williamstown

See also 

 1911 Victorian state election
 Candidates of the 1911 Victorian state election
 Members of the Victorian Legislative Assembly, 1911–1914

References 

Results of Victorian state elections
1910s in Victoria (Australia)